Bonkbuster (a play on "blockbuster" and the verb "to bonk") is a term coined in 1989 by British writer Sue Limb to describe a subgenre of commercial romance novels in the 1970s and 1980s, as well as their subsequent miniseries adaptations. They have also been referred to as sex 'n' shopping or shopping and fucking novels (S&F).

Genre history
Although the term has been used generally to describe "bodice-rippers" such as Forever Amber (1944) by Kathleen Winsor, as well as Valley of the Dolls (1966) and the novels of Jacqueline Susann and Harold Robbins, it is specifically associated with the novels of Judith Krantz, Jackie Collins, Shirley Conran, and Jilly Cooper, known for their glamorous, financially independent female protagonists and salacious storylines. Many of these novels were adapted in the 1980s into glossy, big-budget miniseries, reminiscent of primetime soaps of the time, such as Dallas, Knots Landing and Dynasty.

Examples
 Scruples (1978) by Judith Krantz, adapted as a 1980 miniseries
 Princess Daisy (1980) by Judith Krantz, adapted as a 1983 miniseries
 Bare Essence (1980) by Meredith Rich, adapted as a TV series
 Chances (1981) and Lucky (1985) by Jackie Collins, adapted as a 1990 miniseries
 Lace (1982) by Shirley Conran, adapted as a 1984 miniseries
 Sins (1982) by Judith Gould, adapted as a 1986 miniseries
 Mistral's Daughter (1982) by Judith Krantz, adapted as a 1984 miniseries
 Crossings (1982) by Danielle Steel, adapted as a 1986 miniseries
 Hollywood Wives (1983) by Jackie Collins, adapted as a 1985 miniseries
 Queenie (1985) by Michael Korda, adapted as a 1987 miniseries
 Return to Eden (1985), novelised by Rosalind Miles
 I'll Take Manhattan (1986) by Judith Krantz, adapted as a 1987 miniseries
 Till We Meet Again (1988) by Judith Krantz, adapted as a 1989 miniseries
 Dazzle (1990) by Judith Krantz, adapted as a 1995 miniseries
 Lady Boss (1990) by Jackie Collins, adapted as a 1992 miniseries
 Torch Song (1993) by Judith Krantz

References

Fiction by genre
Romance genres
Literary genres
Hollywood novels